Alex Gordon Kuziak (October 15, 1908 – May 14, 2010) was an educator, businessman and  politician of Ukrainian descent in Saskatchewan. He represented Canora from 1948 to 1964 in the Legislative Assembly of Saskatchewan as a Co-operative Commonwealth Federation (CCF) member.

He was born in Canora, Saskatchewan, the son of Jacob Kuziak and Mary Luchuk, and was educated in Canora, Yorkton and Saskatoon. He attended normal school in Regina and then taught school in Canora for five years. Kuziak next served as secretary-treasurer for the rural municipality of Keys, operated an insurance and real estate business in Canora and was a partner in Canora Electric and Heating. He also was a member of the Canora school board, serving as chairman from 1945 to 1946, and was chairman of the Canora Union Hospital board. In 1935, he married Ann Jarman. Kuziak served in the provincial cabinet as Minister of Telephones, as Minister in charge of the Government Finance Office and as Minister of Natural Resources. He was defeated when he ran for reelection to the provincial assembly in 1964. In 1965, he ran unsuccessfully for the Yorkton seat in the Canadian House of Commons. He served on the city council for Yorkton in 1971. He died in Yorkton in 2010.

References

External links 
 

Saskatchewan Co-operative Commonwealth Federation MLAs
20th-century Canadian politicians
1908 births
2010 deaths
Canadian people of Ukrainian descent
Canadian socialists
Canadian socialists of Ukrainian descent
Canadian centenarians
Men centenarians